Pleasant Hill Township may refer to:

 Pleasant Hill Township, Izard County, Arkansas, in Izard County, Arkansas
 Pleasant Hill Township, Newton County, Arkansas, in Newton County, Arkansas
 Pleasant Hill Township, Pike County, Illinois
 Pleasant Hill Township, Winona County, Minnesota
 Pleasant Hill Township, Cass County, Missouri
 Pleasant Hill Township, Sullivan County, Missouri
 Pleasant Hill Township, Northampton County, North Carolina, in Northampton County, North Carolina
 Pleasant Hill Township, Kidder County, North Dakota, in Kidder County, North Dakota

Township name disambiguation pages